Oldshoremore is a scattered crofting hamlet in the Eddrachillis parish of Sutherland, Scotland. It incorporates around twenty houses, though several of these are holiday homes.

Once owned by the Duke of Sutherland, Oldshoremore and the surrounding area are now part of the Sandwood Estate, a nature reserve owned by the John Muir Trust. Directly west lies Oldshoremore Bay, a sandy beach with a large headland at its northern end known as Eilean na h-Aiteig. The hamlet also contains a car park, toilet facilities, a post box, and a cemetery. A small loch known as Loch Àisir lies to the east.

The nearest good-sized town is Kinlochbervie which lies approximately one mile to the south-east. The hamlet of Oldshore Beg lies to the north-west.

Gallery

References
Oldshoremore. Kinlochbervie Self Catering.
Overview of Oldshoremore. Gazetteer for Scotland.

Populated places in Sutherland